Tzitzis may refer to:
 Tzitzis, the Ashkenazi pronunciation of tzitzit, fringes or tassels found on a tallit or tallit katan worn by observant Jews
 Tzitzis - classical name for Qertassi, an ancient site, now submerged in Lake Nasser, in Lower Nubia, Egypt